Heinrich Scholz (1812, Breslau - 1859) was a German entomologist who specialised in Hemiptera and Diptera.

Heinrich Scholz  was a physician.

Works
partial list
Gravenhorst, J. L. C. and  Scholtz, H. 1842: Beobachtungen über die Verwandlung der Schildkäfer (Cassida).  Nova acta Academiae Caesareae Leopoldino-Carolinae Germanicae Naturae Curiosorum, Halle/Saale [wechselnde Verlagsorte] - 19 (2) 429-440, Taf. LXXIII
Scholz H. 1847. Prodromus zur einer Rhynchoten-Fauna von Schlesien, Theil I. Übers. Arb. Veränd. schles. Ges. vaterl. Kult. 1846: 104-164.
Scholtz, H. 1850: Etwas über die Lebensweise der Tingideen. Zeitschrift für Entomologie herausgegeben von dem Verein für schlesische Insektenkunde zu Breslau, Breslau  4 (2(Nr.14)) 1-4
Scholtz, H. 1850-1851: Beiträge zur Kunde der schlesischen Zweiflügler. Zeitschrift für Entomologie herausgegeben von dem Verein für schlesische Insektenkunde zu Breslau, Breslau - 4, 5 siehe bei den Einzelteilen

His collection of Hemiptera of Silesia is in the natural history museum of the University of Wrocław

References
Cohn, F. 1859: In der siebten Sitzung vom 3. November machte der Sekretair nachstehende Mitteilung [...]. Jahres-Bericht der  Schlesischen Gesellschaft für vaterländische Cultur. Enthält: Arbeiten und Veränderungen der Gesellschaft im Jahre ..., Breslau 3 , pp. 34–35
Syniawa, M. 2000: Biograficzny słownik przyrodników Śląskich. Część 1. [Biographical dictionary of the Silesian Naturalists. Part 1]. Materiay Opracowania, Katowice 3, pp. 184–185, +Schr.verz.

German entomologists
1859 deaths
1812 births
Dipterists